Drosera acaulis is a carnivorous plant belonging to the family Droseraceae and is found in Africa. D. acaulis is a dwarf, rosulate herb with 1-2 thin roots. Leaves are 8 apetiolate, exstiplate, unequal in length, lamina narrowly spathulate approximately 7 mm long and 2 mm wide, bearing both type of tentacles, other wise glabrous. Flower solitary on a pedicel 1–2 mm long, glandular pubescent. Calyx lobes c. 3 mm long. Petals obovate, c. 6 mm long, red or purple. Stamens with terete foments, the connective not rhomboidal. Styles forked from the base, stigmatic apex flabellately multifid.

References

acaulis